Karacaören is a village in the District of Kozan, Adana Province, Turkey. Karacaören literally means "roe deer ruins" in Turkish.

References

Villages in Kozan District